Françoise Dussart (born 14 May 1959 in Paris) is a professor in the Department of Anthropology and the Department of Women's, Gender and Sexuality Studies at the University of Connecticut. Trained in France and Australia, her specialties in social anthropology include Australian Aboriginal society and culture (as well as other Fourth World Peoples), iconography and visual systems, various expressions of gender, ritual and social organization, health and citizenship.

Dussart's career in anthropology began at the Sorbonne, where she studied the ethnolinguistic nuances of West African naming systems, the culture of street performers in Paris, and the slate factories of southern France. She received her Ph.D. degree from the Australian National University for fieldwork with the Warlpiri people living in the Tanami Desert.  Since then, she has also devoted herself to curatorial efforts involving the acrylic painting of Central Desert Aborigines. She has published extensively on matters of Oceanian art for scholarly journals and the popular press, in French and in English. She has also consulted for numerous museums worldwide, writing catalogs, essays and assisting in general collection development.

She is currently working on two related projects, a long-term research project, which investigates how indigenized modernity and indigenous ill-health play a prominent part in shaping neo-settler states such as Australia, for which she has published papers on how Warlpiri people from Central Australia cope with chronic ill-health on a daily basis. She curated the first comprehensive major exhibition of contemporary Aboriginal and Torres Strait Islander arts (over 100 artworks) from Australia in Canada, at the Musée de la Civilisation in Quebec City. This exhibition titled Lifelines: Contemporary Indigenous Art from Australia opened 20 October 2015 and will close 6 September 2016. She currently resides in Providence with her husband and children.

Diabetes

Diabetes and the Reconstruction of Indigenous Sociality 
The statistics among Fourth World Peoples - well documented in Sub-Saharan Africa, throughout the Americas and Asia (Ekoé et al. 2001; Joe and Young 1994; Mbanya and Mbanya 2003; McMurray and Smith 2001; Rock 2005)^are even more dire.1 Indigenously populated regions of Australia have been particularly hard hit by the diabetes pandemic; Aboriginal residents of remote settlements are ten times more likely than the broader population to suffer Type 2 diabetes (Cass et al. 2005). In some Aboriginal communities, one in three adults is afflicted with the disease.

As a result of this dispiriting reality, a good deal of biomedical analysis has been focused on the affliction among indigenous populations. Typically, the work in question presumes that misunderstanding and miscommunication undermine treatment and diagnosis. But my analysis, based on data collected in 2006 and 2007 at a Central Desert Aboriginal settlement, challenges certain aspects of that presumption. Field research suggests that many Aboriginal peoples, knowledgeable about the main etiological aspects of the disease, knowingly sidestep biomedical treatment protocols - strict weight management, the modification of dietary habit and exercise - and translate notions of chronic and acute illness to accommodate their own notions of neocolonial social identity. Indeed, rather than misinterpreting etiologies and treatments, Warlpiri people tend to reinterpret the language surrounding diabetes, and in so doing make manifest, in the medical universe, the land of "indigenization of modernity" that MarshaU SahUns has observed the material and technological cultures of other Fourth World Peoples. Warlpiri people's response to diabetes displays a community not only capable, but compelled, to tailor medical protocols and discourse to indigenously constituted patterns of residential kinship and social connectedness, as well as distinctly Aboriginal notions of personal autonomy. By so doing, Warlpiri people reshape the local praxis of their society (Foucault 1973) in ways that undermine the universalizing discourses of national healthcare organizations, schools, correctional faculties, Christian churches and other "knowledge-making institutions."

References

1959 births
Living people
University of Connecticut faculty